The CAMS 51 was a transport flying boat built in France in the mid-1920s.  Designed as a private venture by Chantiers Aéro-Maritimes de la Seine (CAMS), it was a conventional biplane with two radial engines mounted in a tractor-pusher installation in the interplane gap.  One example (the 51C) was sold to Aéropostale, which used it for tests in preparation for transatlantic services.  CAMS also built a militarised version as the 51R3 in the hopes of interesting the French Navy in it as a reconnaissance aircraft, but no order was forthcoming.  A final aircraft was built as a record-breaking machine originally designated 51-3 R that broke the world payload-to-altitude record on 18 August 1927 by lifting 2,000 kg to 4,684 m (15,368 ft).  This aircraft was later used as a pathfinder for French airmail routes to South America.

Operators

Aéropostale

Specifications (51C)

References

 
 aviafrance.com

51
1920s French mailplanes
Flying boats
Biplanes
Twin-engined push-pull aircraft
Aircraft first flown in 1926